Cyanopepla fastuosa is a moth of the subfamily Arctiinae first described by Francis Walker in 1854. It is found in Venezuela and Brazil and on Jamaica.

References

Moths described in 1854
Cyanopepla